La Concordia Canton is a canton of Ecuador. It is located between provinces Esmeraldas and Santo Domingo de los Tsáchilas Province.  Its capital is the town of La Concordia. Elections on whether to form part of one of those two provinces took place on February 5, 2012. The final resolution was to become part of Santo Domingo de los Tsáchilas Province, thus becoming the 2nd Canton of that province.

Demographics
Ethnic groups as of the Ecuadorian census of 2010:
Mestizo  72.9%
Afro-Ecuadorian  13.9%
White  8.5%
Montubio  3.9%
Indigenous  0.5%
Other  0.3%

References

Cantons of Ecuador